Teresa Sánchez (born July 1, 1964 in Seville) is a Spanish model, who won the title of Miss National in the Miss Spain contest at 1984 and represented  Spain at Miss Universe 1985 where she finished as 1st Runner-Up.

Biography

Sánchez López prepared for a career in modeling at Escuela de Modelos y Promoción de la Moda, located in Seville.

1984, she was elected Miss  Seville and Miss Western Andalucia. That same year she participated in the Miss Spain contest, winning the title of Miss National, gaining the right to compete at Miss Universe the following year.

In 1985, Teresa competed in  Miss Universe 1985 representing Spain where she finished as 1st Runner-Up. This was the highest placement for Spain since 1974 when Amparo Muñoz won the title and remained the highest non-winning placement for the country until 2013 when Patricia Yurena Rodríguez also finished as 1st Runner-Up (coincidentally both Sánchez López and Rodríguez lost to contestants from Latin American countries). During the pageant Sánchez López was a favorite among media and pageant experts to win the crown.

References

External links

1964 births
Living people
Miss Universe 1985 contestants
People from Seville
Spanish female models